Big Black River is an unincorporated community in the northern region of Manitoba, Canada.

References 

Unincorporated communities in Northern Region, Manitoba